Mediator complex subunit 9 (Med9) is a protein that in humans is encoded by the MED9 gene.

Function

The multiprotein Mediator complex is a coactivator required for activation of RNA polymerase II transcription by DNA bound transcription factors. The protein encoded by this gene is thought to be a subunit of the Mediator complex. This gene is located within the Smith–Magenis syndrome region on chromosome 17. [provided by RefSeq, Jul 2008].

See also 
Mediator

References

Further reading